On March 6, 2022, a militant threw a grenade at a marketplace in Srinagar, Indian-administered Jammu and Kashmir, injuring twenty-four people and killing two.

The attack occurred at a market in Hari Singh High Street near the Amira Kadal bridge at around 4:20 P.M. The street was very busy and a large number of people were in the marketplace when the bombing struck. The terrorist threw a grenade at security forces, injuring dozens of people, including at least one policeman.

Later that day, 60-year old Muhammad Aslam Makdhoomi from Nowhatta succumbed to his injuries. 19-year old Rafiya Jan died the following day.

The bombing received widespread condemnation in India, including from Manoj Sinha, Farooq and Omar Abdullah, Mehbooba Mufti, the Jammu Kashmir Pradesh Congress Committee, the Bharatiya Janata Party, and many more.

References 

2020s in Jammu and Kashmir
2022 murders in India
Explosions in 2022
Improvised explosive device bombings in 2022
Grenade attacks
March 2022 events in India
March 2022 crimes in Asia
Marketplace attacks in Asia
Terrorist incidents in India in 2022
Terrorist incidents in Jammu and Kashmir
Srinagar